Bamnan and Slivercork is the first studio album by the US rock band Midlake, released in 2004 to positive reviews. . The songs "Balloon Maker" and "Kingfish Pies" were released as singles.

Track listing
"They Cannot Let It Expand" – 2:58
"Balloon Maker" – 5:05
"Kingfish Pies" – 4:23
"I Guess I'll Take Care" – 3:22
"Some of Them Were Superstitious" – 5:57
"The Reprimand" – 1:21
"The Jungler" – 3:44
"He Tried to Escape" – 4:32
"Mopper's Medley" – 5:02
"No One Knew Where We Were" – 5:06
"Anabel" – 2:26
"Mr. Amateur" – 2:06

Personnel
 Tim Smith — vocals, piano, keyboard, acoustic guitar, electric guitar, flute
 Eric Pulido — electric guitar, acoustic guitar, 12-string acoustic guitar, keyboards, backing vocals
 Eric Nichelson — keyboards, piano, acoustic guitar, 12-string acoustic guitar, electric guitar
 Paul Alexander — bass, double bass, electric guitar, keyboards, piano, bassoon
 McKenzie Smith — drums, percussion

Production notes
 Produced by Midlake
 Recorded and mixed by Midlake
 Art by Tim Smith
 Recorded and mixed in Denton, TX

First LP/vinyl version out on 22. April 2017 for Record Store Day. Yellow vinyl, limited.

References

2004 debut albums
Midlake albums
Bella Union albums